"Come On A My House" is a single by Hey! Say! JUMP. The single was released in three different versions: two limited editions and a regular edition. The first limited edition came with a DVD while the two other versions were just CD's, each with a different list of song (except for the title song). 

The title song was used as the CM song for House Foods’ Vermont Curry.

Regular Edition 
CD
 "Come On A My House"
 "BOUNCE"
 "New Hope (Konna ni Bokura wa Hitotsu)"
 "Come On A My House" (Original Karaoke)
 "BOUNCE" (Original Karaoke)
 "New Hope (Konna ni Bokura wa Hitotsu)" (Original Karaoke)

Limited Edition 1
CD
 "Come On A My House"
 "Come On A My House" (Original Karaoke)

DVD
 "Come On A My House" (PV & Making of)

Limited Edition 2
CD
 "Come On A My House"
 "Just For You" - Hey! Say! 7
 "Scramble" - Hey! Say! BEST
 "Come On A My House" (Original Karaoke)
 "Just For You" (Original Karaoke) - Hey! Say! 7
 "Scramble" (Original Karaoke) - Hey! Say! BEST

Release

References

Hey! Say! JUMP songs
2013 singles
Oricon Weekly number-one singles
Billboard Japan Hot 100 number-one singles